J Hector McKenzie was a Scottish amateur football centre half who played in the Scottish League for Queen's Park. He captained the club and was appointed secretary in 1919.

Personal life 
McKenzie served as a sergeant in the Scottish Horse and then as a private in the Coldstream Guards during the First World War.

References

Year of birth missing
Scottish footballers
Scottish Football League players
British Army personnel of World War I
Association football wing halves
Queen's Park F.C. players
Date of death missing
Scottish Horse soldiers
Coldstream Guards soldiers
Place of birth missing
Queen's Park F.C. non-playing staff